The 2015–16 French Basketball Cup season was the 39th season of the domestic cup competition of French basketball. The competition started on September 11, 2015 and ended on May 1, 2016. Le Mans Sarthe Basket won its 4th Cup.

Final

References

French Basketball Cup
Cup